Pedro Sousa was the defending champion but chose not to defend his title.

Alexandre Müller won the title after defeating Nikola Milojević 7–6(7–3), 6–1 in the final.

Seeds

Draw

Finals

Top half

Bottom half

References

External links
Main draw
Qualifying draw

Internationaux de Tennis de Blois - 1
2022 Singles